Dead Before Dawn is a 1993 television film produced and directed by Charles Correll. The film is based on a true event involving the publicized mid-1980s bitter divorce of Linda and Robert Edelman.

Plot 
Linda Edleman is married to a wealthy and successful Dallas real estate developer Robert. Living in a beautiful home with two children, the couple seems to have it all. Unbeknownst to many, however, is that Linda is physically abused by her husband. One day, she decides she has had enough, packs her stuff and moves back in with her parents John and Virginia. Advised by her lawyer, Linda leaves the children behind in the family's home, reasoning that this way their lives will not be drastically changed. Her parents are upset with this decision, and assign her to a well-established lawyer, Ike Vanden Eykel.

In order to acquire full custody, and to prevent a court case from being pursued, Robert hires a private investigator James Young, and offers him a large sum of money to kill her. A mutual friend, Fred Zabitowski brings Young in contact with the assassin, Zack. After Zack tracks her in the mall and on the highway, Linda starts to notice that she is being followed and rushes to Vanden Eykel's office for help. There, Zack reveals himself as an FBI agent in disguise. The FBI informs Linda that while they have enough evidence to put Young behind bars, they need more evidence to catch Robert. FBI agent Masterson specifically wants to wait until Robert makes the payment for the hit.

Zack tries to stall the murder as long as possible, in order for the FBI to collect as much evidence as possible, but soon Young and Robert grow impatient. Therefore, the FBI decides to stage her murder, taking all her valuable belongings as 'proof', while hiding Linda in a cabin by the lake. Robert, however, grows suspicious when her body does not show up, and stalls the payment. After the FBI informs him of Linda's 'disappearance', Robert starts to take procedures to legally keep his children. This upsets Linda, who considers going back to Dallas to stop Robert, but Zack convinces her to keep low for at least one more day. After Young makes the payment to Zack, he and Robert are arrested for conspiracy to murder, and sentenced to ten years in jail.

Cast
Cheryl Ladd as Linda DeSilva Edelman
Jameson Parker as Robert Edelman
G. W. Bailey as Masterson
Kim Coates as Zack Bell
Matt Clark as John DeSilva
Keone Young as James Young
Stanley Anderson as Ike Vanden Eykel
Hope Lange as Virginia DeSilva
Jensen Daggett as Dana Shoreham
Hollis McCarthy as Miriam DeSilva
Debra Bluford as Terri Beaumont
Ken Boehr as Fred Zabitosky
Kip Niven as Ken Fuller
Andrew Gilchrist as Stephen Edelman
Kimberly Horner as Kathleen Edelman

References

External links

1993 television films
1993 films
1993 drama films
American drama films
Films about domestic violence
Films scored by Sylvester Levay
Drama films based on actual events
1990s English-language films
Films directed by Charles Correll
1990s American films